Kerstin Rybrant (born 10 February 1945) is a Swedish diver. She competed in the women's 3 metre springboard event at the 1964 Summer Olympics.

References

External links
 

1945 births
Living people
Swedish female divers
Olympic divers of Sweden
Divers at the 1964 Summer Olympics
Divers from Stockholm